Rose Lilly Akello (born 23 December 1971) is a Ugandan politician and social worker representing Karenga District as the district woman member of parliament in the eleventh parliament of Uganda. In the ninth and tenth parliament, she served as the district woman member of parliament representing Kaabong District. Rose opted to represent Karenga District instead of Kaabong district because Karenga was carved out of Kaabong on 1 July 2019. She became the Kaabong District Woman MP after winning a by-election in 2017 against Ms Christine Tubo Nakwang. She is affiliated to the ruling political party, NRM.

Education 
In 1986, she completed her Primary Leaving Examinations from Kotido Mixed Primary School. She attained her Uganda Certificate of Education from Kangole Girls S.S. in 1990. She later joined Moroto High School and completed Uganda Advanced Certificate of Education in 1993.  She got a diploma in Hotel Management Studies in 1996 from National College of Business Studies, Nakawa. In 2004, she also completed a diploma in Social Work and Social Administration from Nsamizi Institute of Social Development. In 2013, she obtained Bachelor of Democracy and Development Studies from Uganda Martyrs University. Rose was admitted for a Certificate in Political Science and Administration in China and completed it in 2014.

Work experience 
Between 1993 and 1994, she worked as a teacher Komukuny Girls Primary School. From 2000 to 2010, she served as a member of Kaabong District Service Commission.  From 1995 to 2002, she worked at Karamoja Development Agency, Office of the President as the Senior Stores Assistant. She also served as a member at Kotido District Tender Board between 2002 and 2005. From 2003 to date, she serves as the director of Mowoin Women's Group, Kaabong District.  In 2007, she was employed as the Project Assistant of Oxfam GB, Kotido Field Office.

Political career 
From 2011 to date, Rose as served as the member of parliament, Kaabong District, and Karenga District.

Personal life 
She is married. Rose's hobbies are social mobilization, counselling, reading, playing netball, listening to gospel music, environmental conservation, and dispute settlement.

See also 

 List of members of the ninth Parliament of Uganda
 List of members of the tenth Parliament of Uganda
 List of members of the eleventh Parliament of Uganda

External links 

 Website of the Parliament of Uganda

References 

1971 births
Living people
National Resistance Movement politicians
Women members of the Parliament of Uganda
Members of the Parliament of Uganda
21st-century Ugandan politicians
21st-century Ugandan women politicians